This is a list of games for the Commodore Amiga computer system, organised alphabetically by name. See Lists of video games for related lists.

0–9

007: Licence to Kill
1 across 2 down
1000 Miglia
1869
1943: The Battle of Midway
1st Personal Pinball
3001: O'Connors Fight
3D Construction Kit
3D Construction Kit II
3D Galax
3D Soccer
3D Pool
3D World Boxing
3D World Tennis
4 Soccer Simulations
4D Sports Boxing
4x4 Off-Road Racing
4 Wheel Drive
4th & Inches
4-Get-It
5th Gear
688 Attack Sub
7 Colors
7 Gates of Jambala
7 Tiles
9 Lives
944 Turbo Cup

A

A-10 Tank Killer
A320 Airbus
A.G.E.
A.P.B.
Aaargh!
 A Mind Forever Voyaging
 A Prehistoric Tale
ABC Monday Night Football
ABC Wide World of Sports Boxing
Abandoned Places
Abandoned Places 2
Academy: Tau Ceti II
Act of War
Action Cat
Action Fighter
Action Service
Action Stations!
Addams Family, The
Advanced Destroyer Simulator
Advanced Dungeons & Dragons: Heroes of the Lance
Adventure Construction Set
Adventures of Robin Hood, The
Adventures of Willy Beamish, The
African Raiders
After the War
After Burner
After Burner II
Agony
Air Bucks
Air Force Commander
Air Supply
Air Support
Airstrike USA
Air Warrior
Airball
Airborne Ranger
AirTaxi
Akira
Aladdin's Magic Lamp
Alfred Chicken
Ali Baba
Alienator
Alien³
Alien Bash 2
Alien Breed
Alien Breed II: The Horror Continues
Alien Breed: Tower Assault
Alien Breed 3D
Alien Breed 3D II: The Killing Grounds
Alien Fires 2199 AD
Alien Legion
Alien Storm
Alien Syndrome
Alien World
All Dogs Go to Heaven
All New World of Lemmings
All Quiet on the Library Front
All Terrain Racing
Alpha Waves
Altered Beast
Alternate Reality
Amazing Spider-Man, The
Ambermoon
Amberstar
Amegas
American Gladiators
American Tag-Team Wrestling
Amiga CD Football
Amiga Karate
Amnios
Anarchy
Ancient Art of War in the Skies
Ancient Battles
Ancient Domains of Mystery
Andromeda Mission
Annals of Rome
Another World
Antago
Antares
Antheads: It Came from the Desert II
Apache
Apache Flight
Apano Sin
Apidya
Apocalypse
Apprentice
Aquanaut
Aquaventura
Arabian Nights
Arachnophobia
Arcade ClassiX
Arcade Fruit Machine
Arcade Pool
Arcade Volleyball
Archer Maclean's Pool
Archipelagos
Archon: The Light and the Dark
Archon II: Adept
Arcticfox
Arena 2000
Arkanoid
Arkanoid: Revenge of Doh
Armada
Armalyte
Armour-Geddon
Armour-Geddon 2: Codename Hellfire
Army Moves
Arnhem: The Market Garden Operation
Arnie
Arnie II
Artura
Arya Vaiv
Ashes of Empire
Assassin
Astaroth: Angel of Death
Astate
A.M.C.: Astro Marine Corps
Atax
ATF II
Arthur: The Quest for Excalibur
Atomino
Atomix
A-Train
Aufschwung Ost
Aunt Arctic Adventure
Austerlitz
Australopiticus Mechanicus
Autoduel
AV-8B Harrier Assault
Awesome
Axel's Magic Hammer

B

B.A.T.
B.A.T. II – The Koshan Conspiracy
B-17 Flying Fortress
Baal
Baby Joe
Back to the Future Part II
Back to the Future Part III
Backlash
Bad Company
Bad Dudes Vs. DragonNinja
Badlands Pete
Balance of Power
Balances
Balkanski Konflikt
Ballistic Diplomacy
Ballistix
Bally
Bally II
Bally III
Bandit Kings of Ancient China
Bangboo
Bangkok Knights
Bank Busters
Banshee
Bar Games
Barbarian: The Ultimate Warrior
Barbarian II: The Dungeon of Drax
Bard's Tale, The
Bard's Tale 2, The
Bard's Tale 3, The
Barney Mouse
Baron Baldric: A Grave Adventure
Base Jumpers
Batman
Batman: Caped Crusader
Batman: The Movie
Batman Returns
Battle Chess
Battle Command
Battle Isle
Battle Isle '93
Battle Master
Battle Squadron
Battle Valley
Battlehawks 1942
Battleships
Battlestorm
BattleTech: The Crescent Hawk's Inception
Battletoads
Bazza'n'Runt
Bonk's Adventure
Beach Volley
Beam
Beastlord
Beavers
Behind the Iron Gate
Belial
Beneath a Steel Sky
Benefactor
Benny Beetle
Betrayal
Better Dead Than Alien
Beyond Dark Castle
Beyond the Ice Palace
Bi-Fi: Action in Hollywood
Bi-Fi Roll Snackzone
Big Business
Big Run
Big Sea
Big Nose the Caveman
Biing
Bill's Tomato Game
Bio Challenge
Bionic Commando
Birds of Prey
Bismarck
Black Cauldron, The
Black Crypt
Black Gold (1989) (by reLINE Software)
Black Gold (1992) (by Starbyte Software)
Black Lamp
Black Magic
Black Tiger
Black Viper
Blade
Blade Warrior
Blasteroids
Blinky's Scary School
Blitzbombers
Blitzkrieg
Blob
Blobz
Blockout
Blood Money
Blood Wars
BloodNet
Bloodwych
Blue and the Gray
Blue Angel 69
Blues Brothers, The
Blue Brothers 2, The
BMX Simulator
Bob's Bad Day
Bob's Garden
Body Blows
Body Blows Galactic
Bograts
Bomb Jack
Bomb Jack 2
Bomb Mania
Bomber Bob
Bombfusion
Bombuzal
Bonanza Bros.
Bonecruncher
Boooly
Boppin'
Borrowed Time
Borobodur
Borodino
Börsenfieber
Boulder Dash
Bouncing Bill
Brain Box
Brain Killer
Bram Stoker's Dracula
Brat
Brataccas
Bravo Romeo Delta
Breach 1
Breach 2
Breathless
Breed 2000
Breed 96
Brian the Lion
BrickFast
Brides of Dracula
Brigade Commander
Brutal: Paws of Fury
Brutal Sports Football
BSS Jane Seymour
Bubba 'n' Stix
Bubble and Squeak
Bubble Bobble
Bubble Dizzy
Bubble Heroes
Buck Rogers: Countdown to Doomsday
Buck Rogers: Matrix Cubed
Bucktooth Bob's Jungle Adventure
Budokan: The Martial Spirit
Bug Bash
Bug Bomber
Buggy Boy
Build It
Builderland
Bump'n'Burn
Bumpy's Arcade Fantasy
Burger Man
Burning Rubber
Burnout
Burntime
Burntime AGA
Buster Bros.
By Fair Means or Foul

C

Cabaret Asteroids
Cadaver
Caesar
California Games
Campaign
Cannon Fodder
Cannon Fodder 2
Capital Punishment
Capone
Captain Blood
Captain Dynamo
Captain Fizz
Captain Planet and the Planeteers
Captive
Cardiaxx
Cardinal of the Kremlin, The
Carnage
Carrier Command
Carthage
Cartoons, The
CarVup
Cash
Castle Incinerator
Castle Kingdoms
Castle of Dr. Brain
Castle Warrior
Castles
Castles 2
Castlevania
Catch 'em
Cattivic
Cave Story
Caveman Species
Cedric
Cells: Game of Life
Celtic Legends
Centerbase
Centurion: Defender of Rome
Century
Chambers of Shaolin
Champion Driver
Champions of Krynn
Champions of Raj
Championship Baseball
Championship Manager
Championship Manager 93/94
Championship Run
Chaos Engine, The
Chaos Engine 2, The
Chaos Strikes Back
Chariots of Wrath
Charr
Chartbreaker
Chase
Chase H.Q.
Chicago 90
Chinese Karate
Chip's Challenge
Christminster
ChronoQuest
ChronoQuest II
Chubby Gristle
Chuck Rock
Chuck Rock II: Son of Chuck
Chuckie Egg
Chuckie Egg 2
Circuit Wars
Cisco Heat
Citadel
City Defence
Civilization
CJ in the USA
CJ's Elephant Antics
Clever & Smart
Cliffhanger
Clik Clak
Clockwiser
Cloud Kingdoms
Clown'o'Mania
Cluedo
Clystron
Coala
Codename Hell Squad
Codename: ICEMAN
Cohort
Cohort 2
Colonel's Bequest, The
Colonial Conquest 2
Colony, The
Colorado
Coloris
Combat Air Patrol
Combo Racer
Commando
Computer Diplomacy
Conflict Europe
Conflict: Korea
Conflict: Middle East Political Simulator
Conqueror
Conquests of Camelot: The Search for the Grail
Conquests of the Longbow: The Legend of Robin Hood
Conquistador
Continental Circus
Cool Croc Twins
Cool Spot
Cool World
Corporation
Corruption
Corsarios
Cortex
Corx
Cosmic Bouncer
Cosmic Pirate
Cosmic Spacehead
Cougar Force
Count and Add
Count Duckula
Count Duckula II
Cover Girl Strip Poker
Covert Action
Crack Down
Craps Academy
Crash Garrett
Crash Landing
Crazy Cars
Crazy Cars 2
Crazy Cones
Crazy Seasons
Crazy Sue
Crazy Sue Goes On
Creature
Creatures
Creepers
Creepy
Cricket
Cricket Captain
Crime City
Crossfire 2
Crown
Crown of Ardania
Cruise for a Corpse
Crystal Dragon
Crystal Hammer
Crystal Kingdom Dizzy
Crystal Palace
Crystals of Arborea
Cubit
Cubulus
Curse of Enchantia
Curse of Ra
Curse of the Azure Bonds
Custodian
Cutthroats
Cyber Assault
Cyber Empires
Cyber Force
Cyber Games
Cyber Kick
Cyber World
Cyberball
Cyberblast
Cybercon III
Cybernauts
Cybernoid
Cybernoid 2
Cyberpunks
Cybersphere
Cyberzerk
Cybexion
Cycles
Cygnus 8
Cytadela
Cytron

D

D.R.A.G.O.N. Force
D/Generation
Dalek Attack
Damocles
Dan Dare 3
Danger Castle
Danger Freak
Dangerous Streets
Dark Castle
Dark Century
Dark Fusion
Dark Queen of Krynn, The
Dark Seed
Darkman
Darkmere
DarkSpyre
Das Boot
Das Deutsche Imperium
Das Dschungelbuch
Das Haus
Das Magazin
Datastorm
Dawn Patrol
Day of the Pharaoh
Day of the Viper
Daylight Robbery
Days of Thunder
D-Day
Death Bringer
Death Knights of Krynn
Death Mask
Death or Glory
Death Trap
Deathbots
Deep, The
Deep Core
Defender 2
Defender of the Crown
Defender of the Crown II
Defenders of the Earth
Deflektor
Deja Vu
Deja Vu II: Lost in Las Vegas
Deliverance: Stormlord II
Delivery Agent
Deluxe Galaga
Demon Blue
Demon Wars
Demon's Winter
Dennis the Menace
Der Patrizier
Der Produzent
Der Reeder
Der Seelenturm
Descent: FreeSpace – The Great War
Desert Strike: Return to the Gulf
Designasaurus
Detroit AGA
Deuteros
Diablo
Dick Tracy
Die Drachen von Laas
Die Nordländer
Die unendliche Geschichte 2
Diggers
Dino Dini's Goal
Dino Wars
Dinosaur Detective Agency
Disc
Discovery
Discovery: In the Steps of Columbus
Diskman
Disney's Aladdin
Disposable Hero
Distant Armies
Dithell in Space
Dive Bomber
Dizzy Down the Rapids
Dizzy Panic!
Dizzy Prince of the Yolkfolk
DNA Warrior
Doc Croc's Adventure
Dogfight
Dogs of War
Dojo Dan
Domination
Dominator
Dominium
Donald Duck's Playground
Donk!
Doodlebug
Doofus
Double Agent
Double Dragon
Double Dragon II: The Revenge
Double Dragon 3: The Rosetta Stone
Double Mind
Down at the Trolls
Downhill Challenge
Dr. Doom's Revenge
Dragon Breed
Dragon Fighter
Dragon Spirit
Dragon Wars
Dragon's Breath
Dragon's Lair
Dragon's Lair: Escape from Singe's Castle
Dragon's Lair II: Time Warp
Dragon's Lair III: The Curse of Mordread
Dragonflight
Dragons of Flame
Dragonstone
DragonStrike
Drakkhen
Dreadnoughts
Dreamweb
Drip
Drivin' Force
Drop It
Druid II: Enlightenment
DuckTales: The Quest for Gold
Dune
Dune II
Dungeon Flipper
Dungeon Master
Dungeon Master II: The Legend of Skullkeep
Dungeons of Avalon
Dungeons of Avalon 2: Island of Darkness
Dungeon Quest
Dylan Dog
Dyna Blaster
Dynablasters
Dynamite Düx
Dynasty Wars
Dynatech
Dyter 07
DX-Ball

E

E.S.S.: European Space Simulator
Eagle's Rider
Earl Weaver Baseball
Earth 2140
Ebonstar
Eco
Edd the Duck
Edd the Duck 2
Eggminator
Elf
Elfmania
Eliminator
Elite
Elvira: The Arcade Game
Elvira: Mistress of the Dark
Elvira II: The Jaws of Cerberus
Elysium
Embryo
Emlyn Hughes International Soccer
E-Motion
Emperor of the Mines
Empire
Empire Soccer
Empire: Wargame of the Century
Enchanter
Encounter
England Championship Special
Enterprise
Entity
Epic
Erik
Escape from Colditz
Escape from the Planet of the Robot Monsters
Espionage
ESWAT Cyber Police
Euro Soccer '88
Euro Soccer '92
European Championship 1992
European Football Champ
European Soccer Challenge
Evil Garden
Evil's Doom
Evolution Cryser
Exile
Exodus 3010
Exodus: The Last War
Exolon
Exploration
Extase
Exterminator
Extreme Violence
Eye of Horus
Eye of the Beholder
Eye of the Beholder 2
Eye of the Storm
Eyes of the Eagle

F

F.O.F.T.: Federation of Free Traders
F1
F/A-18 Interceptor
F-117A Stealth Fighter 2.0
F-15 Strike Eagle II
F-16 Combat Pilot
F-16 Falcon 1
F-16 Falcon 2
F17 Challenge
F-19 Stealth Fighter
F29 Retaliator
FA Premier League
Faery Tale Adventure, The
Fah-Yo
Falcon
Fallen Angel
Fantastic Adventures of Dizzy
Fantastic Voyage
Fantasy World Dizzy
Fascination
Fast Eddie's Pool
Fast Food Dizzy
Fate: Gates of Dawn
Fatman
Fears
Feeble Files, The
FernGully Computerized Coloring Book, The
Ferrari Formula One
Fields of Glory
FIFA International Soccer
Fighter Bomber
Fighter Command
Fighter Duel Pro 2
Fightin' Spirit
Fighting Soccer
Fill 'em
Final Battle, The
Final Command
Final Conflict, The
Final Countdown
Final Fight
Final Mission, The
Final Odyssey
Fire
Fire & Brimstone
Fire and Ice
Fire Brigade
Fire Power
Fire Zone
Fireforce
Fireteam 2200
First Contact
First Samurai
Fist Fighter
Flames of Freedom
Flamingo Tours
Flashback
Flight of the Amazon Queen
Flight of the Intruder
Flight Simulator II
Flimbo's Quest
Flink
Flip It & Magnose
Flood
Fly Fighter
Fly Harder
Flying High
Fool's Errand, The
Football Champ
Football Glory
Football Glory Indoors
Football Manager
Football Manager 2
Football Manager World Cup Edition
Footballer of the Year
Forest Dumb Forever
Forgotten Worlds
Formula One 3D
Formula One Grand Prix
Fort Apache
Fortress Underground
Foundation
Foundation Director's Cut
Foundation's Waste
Frankenstein
Franko: The Crazy Revenge
Frenetic
Fright Night
Frontier: Elite II
Fugger
Full Contact
Full Metal Planete
Fullspeed
Fun School 2
Fun School 3
Fun School 4
Fun School Specials
Funsoft Inc.
Furball
Fury of the Furries
Future Space
Future Sport
Future Tank
Future Wars
Fuzzball
Future Basketball

G

Gainforce
Galactic
Galactic Conqueror
Galactic Empire
Galactic Warrior Rats
Galaga 89
Galaga 92
Galaxy 94
Galaga Deluxe
Galaxy Force
Galaxy Force II
Garfield: Winter's Tail
Garrison
Garrison 2
Gateway to the Savage Frontier
Gateway Y
Gauntlet
Gauntlet II
Gauntlet III: The Final Quest
Gazza Soccer 2
Gazza's Superstar Soccer
GBA Championship Basketball: Two-on-Two
Gear Works
Gee Bee Air Rally
Gem Stone Legend
Gemini Wing
Gem'X
Genesia
Genetic Species
Genghis Khan
Genius
Germ Crazy
German Trucking
Ghostbusters II
Ghosts 'n Goblins
Ghouls'n Ghosts
Gilbert: Escape from Drill
Global Chaos
Global Commander
Global Effect
Global Gladiators
Globdule
Globulus
G-LOC: Air Battle
Gloom
Gloom 3
Go
Gobliiins
Gobliins II: The Prince Buffoon
Goblins Quest III
Godfather, The
Gods
Gold of the Americas
Golf of the Aztecs, The
Gold of the Realm
Gold Rush!
Golden Axe
Golden Eagle
Golden Path
Golden Wing
Goldrunner
Goldrunner 2
Graeme Souness Vektor Soccer
Graffiti Man
Graham Gooch World Class Cricket
Graham Taylor's Soccer Challenge
Grand Prix Circuit
Gravity
Grav Attack
Gravity Force
Great Courts II
Great Giana Sisters, The
Great Napoleonic Battles
Gremlins 2
Gridiron!
Guardian
Guardian Angel
Guardians
Gunbee F-99
Gunship
Gunship 2000
Guy Spy and the Crystals of Armageddon

H

H.A.T.E.
Hacker
Hacker II: The Doomsday Papers
Halls of Montezuma
Hammerfist
Hannibal
Hanse
Hanse 2: Gold
Hardball!
Hard Drivin'
Hard Drivin' 2: Drive Harder
Hard Nova
Hard'n'Heavy
Hare Raising Havoc
Harlequin
Harpoon
Hawkeye
Head over Heels
Heart of China
Heart of the Dragon
Heavy Metal
Heavy Metal Heroes
Heimdall
Heimdall 2
Hell Raiser
Hell Squad
Hell Run
Hellfire Attack
Henrietta's Book of Spells
Heretic II
Hex
Hexuma
High Seas Trader
High Steel
Highway Patrol 1
Highway Patrol 2
Hillsea Lido
Hillsfar
Hired Guns
History Line 1914-1918
Hitchhiker's Guide to the Galaxy
Hoi
Hole-in-One Miniature Golf
Hollywood Pictures
Home Alone
Home Alone Computerized Coloring Book, The
Hong Kong Phooey
Hook
Hooray for Henrietta
Horror Zombies from the Crypt
Hostages
Hostile Breed
Hot Ball
Hot Rod
HotShot
Huckleberry Hound
Hudson Hawk
Hugo
Human Killing Machine
Humans, The
Humans 2
Humans 3
Hunt the Fonts
Hunter
Hybris
Hyperdome

References

List: A-H
Amiga: A-H

tr:Amiga Oyunları